Formula Pacific was a motor racing category which was used in the Pacific Basin area from 1977 to 1982. It specified a single-seat, open-wheeler chassis powered by a production-based four-cylinder engine of under 1600cc capacity. The formula was based on Formula Atlantic, with provision made for the use of Japanese engines. The category was superseded in 1983 by Formula Mondial, which was devised by the FIA to replace both Formula Atlantic and Formula Pacific.

Introduction
The Formula Pacific category was created at a meeting of representatives from Pacific Basin countries (Australia, New Zealand, Canada and Japan) in 1976. The formula was based on Formula Atlantic, with provision made for the use of Japanese engines. The first races to be held under the new formula were staged in New Zealand in January 1977.

New Zealand
New Zealand staged its first Formula Pacific races in January 1977 having abandoned Formula 5000 and moved to the new formula in that year.
The category continued there until Formula Mondial was introduced in 1983.

Australia

Formula Pacific was adopted as part of Australian Formula 1 alongside the 5-litre Formula 5000 class in 1979 and it became the sole component of Australian Formula 1 in 1982.  Formula Mondial was adopted as the new Australian Formula 1 in 1983 however cars complying with Formula Pacific would continue to compete alongside the new cars until the end of that year.

Japan
The Japan Automobile Federation ran a Formula Pacific championship from 1978 to 1982.

Macau

The Macau Grand Prix used Formula Pacific regulations from 1977 until Formula 3 rules were adopted for the 1983 event. Winners of the race include eventual F1 drivers Riccardo Patrese and Roberto Moreno.

List of Formula Pacific series winners

% : The 1976 series was open to Formula Atlantic cars.

+ : From 1983 to 1986 the Australian Drivers' Championship was contested by cars complying with Formula Mondial regulations.

References

Formula racing
Motorsport categories in Australia